Caofang is a station on Line 6 of the Beijing Subway. This station opened on December 30, 2012. It was the eastern terminus of Line 6 until the Section II opened on December 28, 2014.

Station layout
The station has an underground island platform.

Exits 
There are 4 exits, lettered A, B, C, and D. Exit D is accessible.

Gallery

References

External links

Beijing Subway stations in Chaoyang District
Railway stations in China opened in 2012